The 2009–10 Vanderbilt Commodores women's basketball team will represent Vanderbilt University in the 2009–10 NCAA Division I basketball season. The Commodores are a member of the Southeastern Conference and will attempt to win the NCAA championship.

Offseason
April 23: The Commodores were honored with a joint resolution presented on the floor of the Tennessee House of Representatives which lauded the squad for its successful 2008–09 season. Representative Brenda Gilmore sponsored the resolution in the House after it was original entered by Senator Douglas Henry.
May 18, 2009 : Former Vanderbilt women's basketball stars Christina Wirth and Jennifer Risper are adjusting to professional basketball. Wirth and Risper, now with the Indiana Fever and the Chicago Sky, helped one another move into their new respective homes this past week. After four years together with the Commodores, separating from each other and the rest of their teammates has been an adjustment. Should they make the final rosters, they will meet three times during the regular season.
On May 28, Ripser and Wirth played against each other. The Sky lost the game 74–67. In the loss, Risper appeared in 9 minutes, had 3 Free Throws, 5 Rebounds, 1 Steal, and 3 points. Christina Wirth played 10 minutes, had 2 free throws, 1 assist, 1 steal, and scored 2 points.
June 17, 2009: The Sommet Center in Nashville, Tenn. will host either the men's or women's SECtournament in each of next four seasons. Nashville was previously revealed as the host of the 2010 men's tournament, and has been awarded the 2011 and 2012 women's tournament and the 2013 men's tournament.
June 25: Jence Rhoads traveled to Austria, Italy and the Czech Republic as part of Athletes International, a non-profit organization that gives American athletes in over a dozen different sports a chance to play around the world.

Preseason

Regular season
February 21: Jence Rhoads had 19 points as the Commodores beat Mississippi by a score of 68–59. It was the Commodores first win in Oxford since 2003.

Roster

Schedule
The Commodores participated in the Vanderbilt Thanksgiving Tournament (held from November 27–28)

Player stats

Postseason

NCAA basketball tournament

Awards and honors
 Elan Brown, 2010 All-SEC Rookie Team
 Tiffany Clarke, 2010 All-SEC Rookie Team
 Merideth Marsh, 2010 Second Team All-SEC
 Jence Rhodes, 2010 First Team All-SEC

Team players drafted into the WNBA

See also
2009–10 NCAA Division I women's basketball season
2009 Vanderbilt Commodores football team

References

External links
Official Site

Vanderbilt Commodores women's basketball seasons
Vanderbilt
Vanderbilt